Francesco Antonio Roberti (1593–1653) was a Roman Catholic prelate who served as Bishop of Alessano (1648–1653).

Biography
Francesco Antonio Roberti was born in 1593 in Cupertino, Italy. On 23 November 1648, he was appointed during the papacy of Pope Innocent X as Bishop of Alessano. On 30 November 1648, he was consecrated bishop by Marcello Lante della Rovere, Cardinal-Bishop of Ostia e Velletri, with Giovan Battista Foppa, Archbishop of Benevento, and Enea di Cesare Spennazzi, Bishop of Ferentino, serving as co-consecrators. He served as Bishop of Alessano until his death in 1653.

References

External links and additional sources
 (for Chronology of Bishops) 
 (for Chronology of Bishops) 

17th-century Italian Roman Catholic bishops
1593 births
1653 deaths
Bishops appointed by Pope Innocent X